The following elections occurred in the year 1829.

 1829 Chilean presidential election
 1829 Papal conclave

North America

United States
 United States Senate special election in New York, 1829

See also
 :Category:1829 elections

1829
Elections